Liu Xiaolong (Chinese: 刘小龙; born 16 February 1989) is a Chinese football player who currently plays for China League Two side Shaoxing Shangyu Pterosaur.

Club career
In 2007, Liu started his professional footballer career with Harbin Yiteng in the China League One division. He was unfortunately part of the squad that was relegated to the third-tier at the end of the 2008 China League One campaign. In the third tier he was able to establish himself within the team and by the 2011 China League Two campaign he would win the division title and promotion back into the second tier. This would be followed by another promotion when the club came runners-up of the 2013 China League One division and gained promotion to the top tier for the first time in the clubs history.

He would make his Chinese Super League debut for Harbin on 7 March 2014 in a game against Shandong Luneng Taishan that ended in a 1-0 defeat. After the game the team struggled within the league and were relegated at the end of the 2014 Chinese Super League season. He would remain loyal to the club until the end of the 2018 China League One season when the club were relegated to the third-tier after failing to apply for a League One license, despite finishing 12th in the season.

Liu transferred to fellow League One side Meizhou Hakka in December 2018. He would make his debut in a league game on 16 March 2019 against Xinjiang Tianshan Leopard in a 4-0 victory. After two seasons where he was utilised as a squad player, Liu would join third tier club Guangxi Pingguo Haliao on loan before joining another third tier club in Shaoxing Shangyu Pterosaur.

Career statistics 
Statistics accurate as of match played 31 December 2022.

Honours

Club
Harbin Yiteng
 China League Two: 2011

References

External links
 

1989 births
Living people
Chinese footballers
Footballers from Dalian
Zhejiang Yiteng F.C. players
Meizhou Hakka F.C. players
Chinese Super League players
China League One players
China League Two players
Association football midfielders